Andrew "Andy" David Ferguson (born 24 March 1985 in Glasgow), is a Scottish football striker currently with Arthurlie.

Career

Ferguson began his career with Ayr United, where he scored 11 times in 55 league games. In the summer of 2005, Ferguson was signed by Dundee, but had a limited impact, making only two starts and scoring two goals all season.

Ferguson signed for Clyde in the summer 2006, and made his début in the Scottish Football League First Division against Partick Thistle. He made 26 appearances overall for Clyde, scoring 4 goals. After his contract expired, Ferguson signed for Alloa Athletic in June 2007. In March 2009 he joined Stenhousemuir on loan, before being released by Alloa at the end of the season.

Ferguson has since played for Glenafton Athletic, Airdrie United and Arthurlie.

References

Sources

Living people
1985 births
Footballers from Glasgow
Scottish footballers
Association football forwards
Dundee F.C. players
Clyde F.C. players
Ayr United F.C. players
Alloa Athletic F.C. players
Stenhousemuir F.C. players
Scottish Football League players
Glenafton Athletic F.C. players
Airdrieonians F.C. players
Arthurlie F.C. players
Scottish Junior Football Association players